Richie Narvaez (born 1965) is an American author and professor. In 2020, he won an Agatha Award and an Anthony Award for his novel Holly Hernandez and the Death of Disco. His work focuses on the Puerto Rican and Nuyorican experience.

Early life and education 
Narvaez's parents came to New York from Puerto Rico, and he was born and raised in Williamsburg, Brooklyn. He attended Brooklyn Technical High School. After graduating from the State University of New York at Stony Brook with a master's degree, he worked as a journalist for magazines such as Cable Guide and TV Guide. He currently teaches at the Fashion Institute of Technology in New York City.

Career 
Narvaez writes in multiple genres about Puerto Rico, urban culture, and social issues. He has a "penchant for placing Latinx characters at the center of his work." His short stories have appeared in a number of magazines and anthologies, including Ellery Queen Mystery Magazine, Mississippi Review, Storyglossia, and Long Island Noir

His first book, Roachkiller and Other Stories, a collection of short stories, was listed by Book Riot as one of the 100 Must-Read Works of Noir.

Narvaez's first novel Hipster Death Rattle explores gentrification and displacement in Williamsburg, Brooklyn. The book has been optioned for CBS TV Studios as a possible TV series for the CW.

His second novel, Holly Hernandez and the Death of Disco, a young adult murder mystery, received positive reviews. The book received an Agatha Award for Best Children's/YA Book and an Anthony Award for Best Juvenile/Young Adult.

In 2020, Narvaez published another collection of short stories, Noiryorican. The title is a portmanteau of "noir" and "Nuyorican." The book was nominated for an Anthony Award for Best Anthology.

In September 2020, LeVar Burton read Narvaez's speculative fiction short story “Room for Rent,” from the anthology Latinx Rising: An Anthology of Science Fiction and Fantasy, on his podcast LeVar Burton Reads.

In 2022, he joined the advisory board of Cambridge University Press's Cambridge Elements in Crime Narratives, which publishes research from scholars and practitioners of crime writing.

Works

Novels
Hipster Death Rattle (2019)

Holly Hernandez and the Death of Disco (2020)

Short story collections 
Roachkiller and Other Stories (2012)

Noiryorican (2020)

Awards and honors
2013 Spinetingler Award for Best Anthology/Short Story Collection for Roachkiller and Other Stories2015 Punchnel’s Hybrid Flash Fiction Contest: “How to Write Flash Fiction”
2018 Named Artist in Residence at the Morris Park Library
2019 Best of 2019 Suspense Thriller by Suspense Magazine for Hipster Death Rattle
2020 Agatha Award for Holly Hernandez and the Death of Disco
2020 Anthony Award for Best Anthology/Collection shortlist for Noiryorican
2020 Anthony Award for Holly Hernandez and the Death of Disco
2021 Bronx Recognizes Its Own (BRIO) Award, from the Bronx Council on the Arts
2021 Agatha Award for Best Short Story shortlist for "Doc's at Midnight"
2021 Anthony Award for Best Short Story shortlist for "Doc's at Midnight"
2022 SUNY Chancellor's Award for Excellence in Adjunct Teaching

References

External links 
 Official website

1965 births
American writers
Puerto Rican writers
People from Williamsburg, Brooklyn
Williamsburg
Living people
Puerto Rican short story writers
Anthony Award winners